The Gratitude Fund is a non-profit organization in New York which provide assistance to the forgotten heroes and veterans of the active struggle for freedom and human rights in the former USSR such as ex-political prisoners, who were imprisoned for many years, and to the families of dissidents who perished in the Soviet prisons.

Yuri Fedorov founded the Fund in 1998 and served as its president until he passed away in September 2022.

The Fund's Board of Directors:
 Vladimir Bukovsky
 Alexander Ginzburg 
 Eduard Kuznetsov
 Yuri Yarim-Agaev

References

External links 
 The Gratitude Fund

Non-profit organizations based in the United States